Alan Rifkin is a Southern California novelist and essayist. A former contributing editor of Details magazine, he has also written for the Los Angeles Times Magazine, Premiere, L.A. Weekly, Buzz and The Quarterly. His first book, Signal Hill, was a finalist for the 2004 Southern California Booksellers Award  in Fiction. He was also a finalist for the 2003 PEN Center USA Award in Journalism. Rifkin hosts The Last We Fake, a weekly serialized fiction podcast from Los Angeles. He lives in Long Beach, California.

Trivia
In the TV series Action, an unknown writer named Adam Rafkin is confused with Alan Rifkin in a key plot point.

References

Books
 Rifkin, Alan. Signal Hill: Stories. City Lights Books. 2003. 
 Rifkin, Alan (co-author), Jerry Burgan, foreword by Sylvia Tyson. Wounds to Bind: A Memoir of the Folk-Rock Revolution. Rowman & Littlefield. 2014. 
 Rifkin, Alan. Burdens by Water: An Unintended Memoir. Brown Paper Press. 2016.

External links

21st-century American novelists
American male journalists
American male novelists
Living people
21st-century American male writers
21st-century American non-fiction writers
Year of birth missing (living people)